The 2021 All-Ireland Under-20 Football Championship was the fourth staging of the All-Ireland Under-20 Championship and the 58th staging overall of a Gaelic football championship for players between the minor and senior grades. The championship began on 1 July and ended on 15 August 2021.

Galway entered the championship as the defending champions, however, they were beaten by Mayo after a penalty shootout in the Connacht semi-final.

The final was played on 15 August 2021 at Croke Park in Dublin, between Offaly and Roscommon, in what was their first ever championship meeting. Offaly won the match by 1-14 to 1-11 to claim their second championship title overall and a first title since 1988.

Results

Connacht Under-20 Football Championship

Quarter-final

Semi-finals

Final

Leinster Under-20 Football Championship

First round

Quarter-finals

Semi-finals

Final

Munster Under-20 Football Championship

Quarter-finals

Semi-finals

Final

Ulster Under-20 Football Championship

Preliminary round

Quarter-finals

Semi-finals

Final

All-Ireland Under-20 Football Championship

Semi-finals

Final

Championship statistics

Top scorers

Top scorers overall

Top scorers in a single game

References

All-Ireland Under-20 Football Championship
All-Ireland Under-20 Football Championships